Alma Pirata is an Argentine 2006 telenovela, created and produced by Cris Morena. In this telenovela, lead roles were portrayed by Benjamín Rojas, Fabián Mazzei, Luisana Lopilato, Mariano Martínez, Nicolás Vázquez, Isabel Macedo, Elsa Pinilla and Julia Calvo.

This show earned 2006 Martín Fierro Award for the best comedy for youngs. Main cast also recorded Alma Pirata soundtrack, mostly Benjamín Rojas. During this show, Luisana Lopilato and Mariano Martinez were together, engaged.

Plot
Three friends change the course of their lives to try to compensate the unfairness of society and, following a family tradition, they found again La Liga de las Espadas (The League of the Swords), a neutral league whose goal is to deliver justice in cases of extreme unfairness. The super goal of three friends is to discover the whereabouts of a treasure, the emerald Alma, to clean up the memory of their fathers, continue with the league and, as soon as they find out about their fathers' murder, to sentence their murderer.

In order to achieve their goals, the three friends create strategies, play characters, imagine ties and simulate risky situations and adventures with confusions and mess. The league has its own laws, among which: never steal of own benefit, do not carry firearms, do not fall in love with the same woman. These could have been followed without any problem, if only gorgeous Allegra and Ciara hadn't appeared.

Allegra, rebellious and arrogant, is the daughter of a powerful businessman, who used to be the fourth member of the original league, and the traitor. She is a journalist and a coworker Ciara's, the newspapers photographer. Ciara, like Allegra, is a lady to be reckoned with. Like her mother (the woman who reveals the secret of the former league) she has a deeper understanding for love. Although she does not share the secrets of the league, she is linked to its history: she is the illegitimate daughter of Gino, Allegra's father. Thus, this will be the story of three adventurers and a woman who will fight for justice, debating among impossible love and passions, amid a game who will help them understand the true history of their fathers and the sense of their lives. For society, they are four mad people, four guys who rebel against the system, four people in love with life, four people who are completely different and who have the defects, mistakes, confusions and virtues that make them more real, more alive.

Alma Pirata is a story about friendship, about never giving up, about adventure and justice, about freedom and loyalty, and most of all, it is about love.
Main characters in Alma Pirata are Cruz Navarro (Benjamín Rojas), the league nickname Mijaíl; Ivan Ferrer (Fabián Mazzei), the league nickname Aramis, Allegra Riganti (Luisana Lopilato), the league nickname Laika; Benicio de Marco (Mariano Martinez), the league nickname Templario; Andrés de Marco (Nicolás Vazquez), the league nickname Aorta; beautiful Clara Troglio (Isabel Macedo) and Marylin Castellano (Elsa Pinilla), Cruz's love.

Cast
Mariano Martínez as Benicio de Marco
Luisana Lopilato as Allegra Riganti
Nicolás Vázquez as Andrés de Marco
Benjamín Rojas as Cruz Navarro
Fabián Mazzei as Ivan Ferrer
Isabel Macedo as Clara Troglio
Ignacio Gadano as Gino Riganti
Elsa Pinilla as Maria Lidia 'Marylin' Castellano
Julia Calvo as Carlota 'Charly' Troglio
Peto Menahem as Pablo Rique "El Maestro"
Agustina Córdova as Candelaria Navarro
Gerardo Chendo as Francisco
Misha Arobelidze as Matias

Awards  and nominations
Martin Fierro Awards
2006: Best Youth Comedy - WON

External links
Alma Pirata Official
Alma Pirata on IMDb.

2006 telenovelas
2006 Argentine television series debuts
2007 Argentine television series endings
Argentine telenovelas
Telefe telenovelas
Spanish-language telenovelas